Neryuktyayinsk 2-y is a rural locality (a selo) and the administrative center of Neryuktyayinsky 2-y Rural Okrug of Olyokminsky District in the Sakha Republic, Russia, located  from Olyokminsk, the administrative center of the district. Its population as of the 2010 Census was 832; up from 817 recorded in the 2002 Census.

References

Notes

Sources
Official website of the Sakha Republic. Registry of the Administrative-Territorial Divisions of the Sakha Republic. Olyokminsky District. 

Rural localities in Olyokminsky District